Beka Bitsadze (born March 24, 1991) is a Georgian rugby union number 8 playing for Niort. He has played for the Georgia national team twenty times.

Biography
Bitsadze was born in Tbilisi and played for the youth Rugby Club Iveria under Mikheil Chachua before moving up to play in the Georgia Championship for RC Army Tbilisi (2010-2014), then in the National League for FC Locomotive Tbilisi (2014-2015).

External links
It's Rugby France bio
All Rugby bio

References

1991 births
Living people
Rugby union players from Georgia (country)
Rugby union number eights
Georgia international rugby union players